The enzyme oleoyl-[acyl-carrier-protein] hydrolase (EC 3.1.2.14) catalyzes the reaction

an oleoyl-[acyl-carrier-protein] + H2O  an [acyl-carrier-protein] + oleate

This enzyme belongs to the family of hydrolases, specifically those acting on thioester bonds.  The systematic name is oleoyl-[acyl-carrier-protein] hydrolase. Other names in common use include acyl-[acyl-carrier-protein] hydrolase, acyl-ACP-hydrolase, acyl-acyl carrier protein hydrolase, oleoyl-ACP thioesterase, and oleoyl-acyl carrier protein thioesterase.  This enzyme participates in fatty acid biosynthesis.

Structural studies

References

 
 

EC 3.1.2
Enzymes of known structure